Hooker-Ensle-Pierce House is a historic home located in Center Township, Vanderburgh County, Indiana. The original log cabin was built in 1839, and subsequently expanded with a second log cabin connected by a breezeway.  The breezeway was enclosed and the house expanded in the 1880s, and the housed remodeled in 1917 and 1937.  The two-story dwelling has a side-gable roof and full-width, one-story front porch.

It was added to the National Register of Historic Places in 1977.

References

Houses on the National Register of Historic Places in Indiana
Houses completed in 1839
Houses in Vanderburgh County, Indiana
National Register of Historic Places in Vanderburgh County, Indiana